5th OTO Awards

NTC, Bratislava, Slovakia

Overall winner  Zdena Studenková

Hall of Fame  Milan Lasica

EuroTelevízia Award  Dievča za milión

◄ 4th | 6th ►

The 5th OTO Awards, honoring the best in Slovak popular culture for the year 2004, took time and place on February 9, 2005, at the National Tennis Center (NTC) in Bratislava. The ceremony broadcast live STV. The host of the show, for a change, was Halina Pawlowská.

Performers
 Martin Babjak, opera singer
 Gladiator, band
 Misha, singer
 Dara Rolins, singer
 Zuzana Smatanová, singer
 Tina, singer
 Miroslav Žbirka and Linda Žbirková, singer

Winners and nominees

Main categories
 Television

 Music

Others

References

External links
 Archive > OTO 2004 – 5th edition  (Official website)
 OTO 2004 – 5th edition (Official website - old)

05
2004 in Slovak television
2004 in Slovak music
2004 television awards